The 1954 Cal Poly Mustangs football team represented California Polytechnic State College—now known as California Polytechnic State University, San Luis Obispo—as a member of the California Collegiate Athletic Association (CCAA) during the 1954 college football season. Led by fifth-year head coach LeRoy Hughes, Cal Poly compiled an overall record of 6–4 with a mark of 3–1 in conference play, placing second in the CCAA. The team outscored its opponents 221 to 141 for the season. The Mustangs played home games at Mustang Stadium in San Luis Obispo, California.

Schedule

Team players in the NFL
The following were selected in the 1955 NFL Draft.

Notes

References

Cal Poly
Cal Poly Mustangs football seasons
Cal Poly Mustangs football